The Passion of the Christ is a 2004 American epic biblical drama film produced, directed and co-written by Mel Gibson and starring Jim Caviezel as Jesus of Nazareth, Maia Morgenstern as Mary, mother of Jesus, and Monica Bellucci as Mary Magdalene. It depicts the Passion of Jesus largely according to the gospels of Matthew, Mark, Luke and John. It also draws on pious accounts such as the Friday of Sorrows, along with other devotional writings, such as the reputed visions attributed to Anne Catherine Emmerich.

As per the title, the film primarily covers the final 12 hours before Jesus Christ's death, known as "the Passion". It begins with the Agony in the Garden of Olives (i.e., Gethsemane), continues with the betrayal of Judas Iscariot, the brutal Scourging at the Pillar, the suffering of Mary as prophesied by Simeon, the crucifixion and death of Jesus, and ends with a brief depiction of his resurrection. However, the film also depicts flashbacks to particular moments in Jesus's life, some of which are biblically based, such as The Last Supper and The Sermon on the Mount, and others that are artistic license, as when Mary comforts Jesus and when Jesus crafts a table.

The film was mostly shot in Italy. The dialogue is entirely in Hebrew, Latin, and reconstructed Aramaic. Although Gibson was initially against it, the film is subtitled.

The film was controversial and received polarized reviews, with some critics calling the film a religious and holy experience, praising the performances of the cast, production values, and John Debney’s musical score, while others found it anti-semitic and criticized the violence as extreme. The film grossed over $612 million worldwide and became the fifth highest-grossing film of 2004 internationally at the end of its theatrical run. It is the highest-grossing (inflation unadjusted) Christian film and independent film of all time. It received three nominations at the 77th Academy Awards in 2005, for Best Makeup, Best Cinematography, and Best Original Score. A sequel centered around the resurrection of Jesus is in development.

Plot
In the Garden of Gethsemane, Jesus prays with his disciples Peter, James, and John beside him. Satan soon appears and tempts Jesus as his sweat suddenly turns into blood and a serpent emerges from Satan's guise. Jesus then rebukes Satan by crushing the serpent's head. Later on, Judas Iscariot, Jesus' disciple who has been bribed by Caiaphas and the Pharisees with thirty pieces of silver, leads a group of temple guards to the forest and betrays Jesus' identity. As the guards arrest Jesus, a fight erupts wherein Peter draws his dagger and slashes the ear of Malchus, the commander of the guards. Jesus heals Malchus' injury while reprimanding Peter. As the disciples flee, the guards secure Jesus and they beat him on the way to the Sanhedrin.

John informs Mary and Magdalene of the arrest, and they reunite with Peter who has followed Jesus and his captors. Caiaphas holds trial during which false accusations and witnesses are brought against Jesus and some priests, who secretly support him and oppose the trial, are expelled from the court. When Caiaphas asks him whether he is the Son of God, Jesus replies, "I am". Caiaphas angrily tears his robes and Jesus is condemned to death for blasphemy. As Jesus is brutally beaten, Peter is confronted by the mob and he denies that he is a follower of Jesus. After cursing them during the third denial, Peter remembers Jesus's forewarning, then he weeps bitterly and runs away. Meanwhile, a guilt-ridden Judas attempts to return the money to have Jesus freed, but is refused by the priests. Haunted by demons, Judas takes a rope from a donkey's rotting corpse and uses it to hang himself.

Caiaphas and the crowd bring Jesus before Pontius Pilate, the Roman governor of Judea, to be condemned to death. At the urging of his wife Claudia, who knows Jesus is holy, and after questioning Jesus and found no fault, Pilate transfers him to the court of Herod Antipas, as Jesus is from Antipas' domain of Galilee. Antipas also finds no fault in Jesus and returns him. Pilate then offers the crowd the choice of freeing Jesus or the violent criminal Barabbas. The crowd demands Barabbas be freed and Jesus crucified. Attempting to appease the crowd, Pilate orders that Jesus simply be flogged. The Roman guards brutally scourge and mock Jesus before taking him to a barn where they insult him by saying "Hail, king of the Jews" as they place a crown of thorns on his head. A bloodied Jesus is presented before Pilate and the crowd, but Caiaphas, with the crowds' verbal backing, continues demanding that Jesus be crucified. Unwilling to instigate an uprising, Pilate reluctantly orders Jesus's crucifixion as he washes his hands to avoid blame.
 
Jesus then carries a heavy wooden cross on the road to Golgotha while Satan observes Jesus' suffering with sadistic pleasure. Along the way, Jesus is constantly harrassed by the guards and rampant mob, encounters his mother who comforts him for a short while before being pulled away by the guards, is helped by the unwilling Simon of Cyrene, and is replenished by a woman who wipes his bloodied face with her veil before also being dragged away by the guards. At the end of their journey, with his mother Mary, Magdalene, John, and many others witnessing, Jesus is crucified.

Hanging from the cross, Jesus prays to God to forgive his tormentors, provides salvation to a criminal crucified beside him for his strong faith and repentance, and comforts his mother. Succumbing to his wounds, Jesus surrenders his spirit and dies. A single droplet of rain then falls from the sky to the ground, triggering an earthquake which damages the temple and rips the veil covering the Holy of Holies in two while Satan screams in defeat from the depths of Hell. Jesus's body is later taken down from the cross and entombed. Three days later, Jesus rises from the dead and exits the tomb, with wound holes visible on his palms.

Cast

Jim Caviezel as Jesus Christ
Maia Morgenstern as Mary, the mother of Jesus
Christo Jivkov as John
Francesco De Vito as Peter
Monica Bellucci as Mary Magdalene
Mattia Sbragia as Caiaphas
Toni Bertorelli as Annas ben Seth
Luca Lionello as Judas Iscariot
Hristo Naumov Shopov as Pontius Pilate
Claudia Gerini as Claudia Procles
Fabio Sartor as Abenader
Giacinto Ferro as Joseph of Arimathea
Olek Mincer as Nicodemus
Sheila Mokhtari as Woman in audience
Sergio Rubini as Dismas
Roberto Bestazoni as Malchus
Francesco Cabras as Gesmas
Giovanni Capalbo as Cassius
Rosalinda Celentano as Satan
Emilio De Marchi as Scornful Roman
Lello Giulivo as Brutish Roman
Abel Jafry as 2nd Temple officer
Jarreth Merz as Simon of Cyrene
Rossella Vetrano as Veronica
Matt Patresi as Janus
Roberto Visconti as Scornful Roman
Luca De Dominicis as Herod Ántipas
Chokri Ben Zagden as James
Sabrina Impacciatore as St. Veronica
Pietro Sarubbi as Barabbas
Ted Rusoff as Chief Elder

Themes
In The Passion: Photography from the Movie "The Passion of the Christ", director Mel Gibson says, "This is a movie about Love, Hope, Faith and forgiveness. Jesus died for all mankind, suffered for all of us. It's time to get back to that basic message. The world has gone nuts. We could all use a little more Love, Faith, Hope and forgiveness."

Source material

New Testament
According to Mel Gibson, the primary source material for The Passion of the Christ is the four canonical Gospel narratives of Christ's passion. The film includes a trial of Jesus at Herod's court, which is only found in the Gospel of Luke. The film also draws from other parts of the New Testament. One line spoken by Jesus in the film, "I make all things new", is found in the Book of Revelation, Chapter 21, verse 5.

Old Testament
The film also refers to the Old Testament. The film begins with an epigraph from the Fourth Song of the Suffering Servant from Isaiah. In the opening scene set in the Garden of Gethsemane, Jesus crushes a serpent's head in direct visual allusion to Genesis 3:15. Throughout the film, Jesus quotes from the Psalms, beyond the instances recorded in the New Testament.

Traditional iconography and stories
Many of the depictions in the film deliberately mirror traditional representations of the Passion in art. For example, the 14 Stations of the Cross are central to the depiction of the Via Dolorosa in The Passion of the Christ. All the stations are portrayed except for the eighth station (Jesus meets the women of Jerusalem, a deleted scene on the DVD) and the fourteenth station (Jesus is laid in the tomb). Gibson was inspired by the representation of Jesus on the Shroud of Turin.

At the suggestion of actress Maia Morgenstern, the Passover Seder is quoted early in the film. Mary asks "Why is this night different from other nights?", and Mary Magdalene replies with the traditional response: "Because once we were slaves, and we are slaves no longer."

The conflation of Mary Magdalene with the adulteress saved from stoning by Jesus has some precedent in Catholic tradition, and according to the director was done for dramatic reasons. The names of some characters in the film are traditional and extra-Scriptural, such as the thieves crucified alongside the Christ, Dismas and Gesmas (also Gestas).

The film was mostly inspired by visions from Catholic visionaries such as Mary of Jesus of Ágreda and Anne Catherine Emmerich. The Dolorous Passion of Our Lord Jesus Christ, a book by Clemens Brentano that details the visions of Anne Catherine Emmerich was particularly inspiring to Gibson because it provided vivid descriptions of the crucifixion, as well as additional roles played by Mary Jesus' mother.

The depiction of Veronica wiping the face of Jesus is from a Catholic tradition and relates to a relic known as the Veil of Veronica. The film slightly showed the veil bearing the image of the face of Jesus. Its origin lies in the sixth Station of the Cross, in which Saint Veronica wipes Jesus's face with her veil after he encounters her along the Via Dolorosa to Calvary.

Production

Script and language
Gibson originally announced that he would use two old languages without subtitles and rely on "filmic storytelling". Because the story of the Passion is so well known, Gibson felt the need to avoid vernacular languages in order to surprise audiences: "I think it's almost counterproductive to say some of these things in a modern language. It makes you want to stand up and shout out the next line, like when you hear 'To be or not to be' and you instinctively say to yourself, 'That is the question.'" The script was written in English by Gibson and Benedict Fitzgerald, then translated by William Fulco, S.J., a professor at Loyola Marymount University, into Latin and reconstructed Aramaic. Fulco sometimes incorporated deliberate errors in pronunciations and word endings when the characters were speaking a language unfamiliar to them, and some of the crude language used by the Roman soldiers was not translated in the subtitles.

Filming

The film was produced independently and shot in Italy at Cinecittà Studios in Rome, and on location in the city of Matera and the ghost town of Craco, both in the Basilicata region. The estimated US$30 million production cost, plus an additional estimated $15 million in marketing costs, were fully borne by Gibson and his company Icon Productions. According to the DVD special feature, Martin Scorsese had recently finished his film Gangs of New York, from which Gibson and his production designers constructed part of their set. This saved Gibson a lot of time and money.

Gibson's film was released on Ash Wednesday, February 25, 2004. Icon Entertainment distributed the theatrical version of the film, and 20th Century Fox distributed the VHS/DVD/Blu-ray version of the film.

Gibson consulted several theological advisers during filming, including Fr. Jonathan Morris, and a local priest, Philip J. Ryan, who visited the set daily to provide counsel, Confession, and Holy Communion to Jim Caviezel, and Masses were celebrated for cast and crew in several locations. During filming, assistant director Jan Michelini was struck twice by lightning. Minutes later, Caviezel also was struck.

Music
Three albums were released with Mel Gibson's co-operation: (1) the film soundtrack of John Debney's original orchestral score conducted by Nick Ingman; (2) The Passion of the Christ: Songs, by producers Mark Joseph and Tim Cook, with original compositions by various artists, and (3) Songs Inspired by The Passion of the Christ. The first two albums each received a 2005 Dove award, and the soundtrack received an Academy Award nomination of Best Original Music Score.

A preliminary score was composed and recorded by Lisa Gerrard and Patrick Cassidy, but was incomplete at film's release. Jack Lenz was the primary musical researcher and one of the composers; several clips of his compositions have been posted online.

Title change
Although Mel Gibson wanted to call his film The Passion, on October 16, 2003, his spokesman announced that the title used in the United States would be The Passion of Christ because Miramax Films had already registered the title The Passion with the MPAA for the 1987 novel by Jeanette Winterson. Later, the title was changed again to The Passion of the Christ for all markets.

Distribution and marketing
Gibson began production on his film without securing outside funding or distribution. In 2002, he explained why he could not get backing from the Hollywood studios: "This is a film about something that nobody wants to touch, shot in two dead languages." Gibson and his company Icon Productions provided the film's sole backing, spending about $30 million on production costs and an estimated $15 million on marketing. After early accusations of antisemitism, it became difficult for Gibson to find an American distribution company. 20th Century Fox initially had a first-look deal with Icon but decided to pass on the film in response to public protests. In order to avoid the spectacle of other studios turning down the film and to avoid subjecting the distributor to the same intense public criticism he had received, Gibson decided to distribute the film in the United States himself, with the aid of Newmarket Films.

Gibson departed from the usual film marketing formula. He employed a small-scale television advertising campaign with no press junkets. Similar to marketing campaigns for earlier biblical films like The King of Kings, The Passion of the Christ was heavily promoted by many church groups, both within their organizations and to the public. Typical licensed merchandise like posters, T-shirts, coffee mugs and jewelry was sold through retailers and websites. The United Methodist Church stated that many of its members, like other Christians, felt that the film was a good way to evangelize non-believers. As a result, many congregations planned to be at the theaters, and some set up tables to answer questions and share prayers. Rev. John Tanner, pastor of Cove United Methodist Church in Hampton Cove, Alabama, said: "They feel the film presents a unique opportunity to share Christianity in a way today's public can identify with." The Seventh-day Adventist Church also expressed a similar endorsement of the picture.

Evangelical support
The Passion of the Christ received enthusiastic support from the American evangelical community. Before the film's release, Gibson actively reached out to evangelical leaders seeking their support and feedback. With their help, Gibson organized and attended a series of pre-release screenings for evangelical audiences and discussed the making of the film and his personal faith. In June 2003 he screened the film for 800 pastors attending a leadership conference at New Life Church, pastored by Ted Haggard, then president of the National Association of Evangelicals. Gibson gave similar showings at Joel Osteen's Lakewood Church, Greg Laurie's Harvest Christian Fellowship, and to 3,600 pastors at a conference at Rick Warren's Saddleback Church in Lake Forest.

From the summer of 2003 to the film's release in February 2004, portions or rough cuts of the film were shown to over eighty audiences—many of which were evangelical audiences. The film additionally received public endorsements from evangelical leaders, including Rick Warren, Billy Graham, Robert Schuller, Darrell Bock, Christianity Today editor David Neff, Pat Robertson, Lee Strobel, Jerry Falwell, Max Lucado, Tim LaHaye and Chuck Colson.

Release

Box office and theatrical run
The Passion of the Christ opened in the United States on February 25, 2004 (Ash Wednesday, the beginning of Lent). It earned $83,848,082 from 4,793 screens at 3,043 theaters in its opening weekend and a total of $125,185,971 since its Wednesday opening, ranking it fourth overall in domestic opening weekend earnings for 2004 as well as the biggest weekend debut for a February release (until Fifty Shades of Grey was released). The film tied with The Lord of the Rings: The Return of the Kings record for having the highest five-day Wednesday opening. Moreover, The Passion of the Christ scored the second biggest opening weekend for any R-rated movie, behind The Matrix Reloaded. It went on to earn $370,782,930 overall in the United States, and remains the highest grossing R-rated film in the domestic market (U.S. & Canada). The film sold an estimated 59,625,500 tickets in the US in its initial theatrical run.

In the Philippines, a majority-Catholic country, the film was released on March 31, 2004, rated PG-13 by the Movie and Television Review and Classification Board (MTRCB) and endorsed by the Catholic Bishops Conference of the Philippines (CBCP).

In Malaysia, government censors initially banned it completely, but after Christian leaders protested, the restriction was lifted, but only for Christian audiences, allowing them to view the film in specially designated theaters. In Israel, the film was not banned. However, it never received theatrical distribution because no Israeli distributor would market it.

Despite the many controversies and refusals by some governments to allow the film to be viewed in wide release, The Passion of the Christ earned $612,054,428 worldwide. The film was also a relative success in certain countries with large Muslim populations, such as in Egypt, where it ranked 20th overall in its box office numbers for 2004. The film was the highest grossing non-English-language film of all time until 2017, when it was surpassed by Wolf Warrior 2.

Re-edited theatrical release on March 11, 2005
The Passion Recut was released in theaters on March 11, 2005, with five minutes of the most explicit violence deleted. Gibson explained his reasoning for this re-edited version: 

Despite the re-editing, the Motion Picture Association of America still deemed The Passion Recut too violent for PG-13, so its distributor released it as unrated. The shortened film showed for three weeks in 960 theaters for a box office total of $567,692, minuscule compared to the $612,054,428 of The Passion.

Home media
On August 31, 2004, the film was released on VHS and DVD in North America by 20th Century Fox Home Entertainment, which initially passed on theatrical distribution. As with the original theatrical release, the film's release on home video formats proved to be very popular. Early estimates indicated that over 2.4 million copies of the film were sold by 3:00p.m., with a total of 4.1 million copies on its first day of sale. The film was available on DVD with English and Spanish subtitles and on VHS tape with English subtitles. The film was released on Blu-ray in North America as a two-disc Definitive Edition set on February 17, 2009. It was also released on Blu-ray in Australia a week before Easter.

Although the original DVD release sold well, it contained no bonus features other than a trailer, which provoked speculation about how many buyers would wait for a special edition to be released. On January 30, 2007, a two-disc Definitive Edition was released in the North American markets, and March 26 elsewhere. It contains several documentaries, soundtrack commentaries, deleted scenes, outtakes, the 2005 unrated version, and the original 2004 theatrical version.

The British version of the two-disc DVD contains two additional deleted scenes. In the first, Jesus meets the women of Jerusalem (at the eighth station of the cross) and falls to the ground as the women wail around him, and Simon of Cyrene attempts to hold up the cross and help up Jesus simultaneously. Afterwards, while both are holding up the cross, Jesus says to the women weeping for him, "Do not weep for me, but for yourselves and for your children". In the second, Pilate washes his hands, turns to Caiaphas, and says: "Look you to it" (i.e., the Pharisees wish to have Jesus crucified). Pilate then turns to Abanader and says: "Do as they wish". The scene next shows Pilate calling to his servant, who is carrying a wooden board on which Pilate writes, "Jesus of Nazareth, the King of the Jews", in Latin and Hebrew. He then holds the board above his head in full view of Caiaphas, who after reading it challenges Pilate on its content. Pilate replies angrily to Caiaphas in non-subtitled Hebrew. The disc contains only two deleted scenes in total. No other scenes from the movie are shown on disc 2.

On February 7, 2017, 20th Century Fox re-released the film on Blu-ray and DVD featuring both cuts, with the theatrical version being dubbed in English and Spanish; this marks the first time the film has ever been dubbed in another language.

Television broadcast
On April 17, 2011 (Palm Sunday), Trinity Broadcasting Network (TBN) presented the film at 7:30 p.m. ET/PT, with multiple showings scheduled. The network has continued to air the film throughout the year, and particularly around Easter.

On March 29, 2013 (Good Friday), as a part of their special Holy Week programming, TV5 presented the Filipino-dubbed version of the film at 2:00p.m. (PST, UTC+8) in the Philippines. Its total broadcast ran for two hours, but excluding the advertisements, it would only run up for approximately one hour instead of its full run time of two hours and six minutes. It ended at 4:00 p.m. It has been rated SPG by the Movie and Television Review and Classification Board (MTRCB) for themes, language and violence with some scenes censored for television. TV5 is the first broadcast network outside of the United States and dubbed the Vernacular Hebrew and Latin language to Filipino (through translating its supplied English subtitles).

Reception

Critical response
On Rotten Tomatoes, the film holds an approval rating of 49% based on 281 reviews, with an average rating of 6/10. The website's critical consensus reads: "Director Mel Gibson's zeal is unmistakable, but The Passion of the Christ will leave many viewers emotionally drained rather than spiritually uplifted." On Metacritic, the film has a weighted average of 47 out of 100, based on 44 critics, indicating "mixed or average reviews". Audiences polled by CinemaScore gave the film a rare "A+" grade.

In a positive review for Time, its critic Richard Corliss called The Passion of the Christ "a serious, handsome, excruciating film that radiates total commitment." New York Press film critic Armond White praised Gibson's direction, comparing him to Carl Theodor Dreyer in how he transformed art into spirituality. White also noted that it was odd to see Director Mel Gibson offer audiences "an intellectual challenge" with the film. Roger Ebert from the Chicago Sun-Times gave the movie four out of four stars, calling it "the most violent film I have ever seen" as well as reflecting on how it struck him, a former altar boy: "What Gibson has provided for me, for the first time in my life, is a visceral idea of what the Passion consisted of. That his film is superficial in terms of the surrounding message—that we get only a few passing references to the teachings of Jesus—is, I suppose, not the point. This is not a sermon or a homily, but a visualization of the central event in the Christian religion. Take it or leave it."

In a negative review, Slate magazine's David Edelstein called it "a two-hour-and-six-minute snuff movie", and Jami Bernard of the New York Daily News felt it was "the most virulently anti-Semitic movie made since the German propaganda films of World War II". Writing for the Dallas Observer, Robert Wilonsky stated that he found the movie "too turgid to awe the nonbelievers, too zealous to inspire and often too silly to take seriously, with its demonic hallucinations that look like escapees from a David Lynch film; I swear I couldn't find the devil carrying around a hairy-backed midget anywhere in the text I read."

The June 2006 issue of Entertainment Weekly named The Passion of the Christ the most controversial film of all time, followed by Stanley Kubrick's A Clockwork Orange (1971). In 2010, Time listed it as one of the most "ridiculously violent" films of all time.

Accolades

Wins
National Board of Review – Freedom of Expression (tie)
People's Choice Awards – Favorite Motion Picture Drama
Satellite Awards – Best Director
Ethnic Multicultural Media Academy (EMMA Awards) – Best Film Actress – Maia Morgenstern
Motion Picture Sound Editors (Golden Reel Awards) – Best Sound Editing in a Feature Film – Music – Michael T. Ryan
American Society of Composers, Authors and Publishers – ASCAP Henry Mancini Award – John Debney
Hollywood Film Festival, US – Hollywood Producer of the Year – Mel Gibson
GMA Dove Award, The Passion of the Christ Original Motion Picture Soundtrack, Instrumental Album of the Year
Golden Eagle Award – Best Foreign Language Film

Nominations
Academy Awards
Best Cinematography – Caleb Deschanel
Best Makeup – Keith Vanderlaan, Christien Tinsley
Best Original Score – John Debney
American Society of Cinematographers – Outstanding Achievement in Cinematography in Theatrical Releases – Caleb Deschanel
Broadcast Film Critics Association Awards – Best Popular Movie
Irish Film and Television Awards – Jameson People's Choice Award for Best International Film
MTV Movie Awards – Best Male Performance – Jim Caviezel

Other honors
The film was nominated in the following categories for American Film Institute recognition:
2006: AFI's 100 Years...100 Cheers – Nominated
2008: AFI's 10 Top 10 – Nominated Epic Film

Controversies

Questions of historical and biblical accuracy
Despite criticisms that Gibson deliberately added material to the historical accounts of first-century Judea and biblical accounts of Christ's crucifixion, some scholars defend the film as not being primarily concerned with historical accuracy. Biblical scholar Mark Goodacre protested that he could not find one documented example of Gibson explicitly claiming the film to be historically accurate. Gibson has been quoted as saying: "I think that my first duty is to be as faithful as possible in telling the story so that it doesn't contradict the Scriptures. Now, so long as it didn't do that, I felt that I had a pretty wide berth for artistic interpretation, and to fill in some of the spaces with logic, with imagination, with various other readings." One such example is a scene in which Judas Iscariot is shown being tormented by demons in the form of children. Another scene shows Satan carrying a demonic baby during Christ's flogging, construed as a perversion of traditional depictions of the Madonna and Child, and also as a representation of Satan and the Antichrist. Gibson's description:

When asked about the film's faithfulness to the account given in the New Testament, Father Augustine Di Noia of the Vatican's Doctrinal Congregation replied: "Mel Gibson's film is not a documentary... but remains faithful to the fundamental structure common to all four accounts of the Gospels" and "Mel Gibson's film is entirely faithful to the New Testament".

Disputed papal endorsement
On December 5, 2003, Passion of the Christ co-producer Stephen McEveety gave a rough cut of the film to Archbishop Stanisław Dziwisz, the pope's secretary. Pope John Paul II watched the film in his private apartment with Archbishop Dziwisz that night, and later met with McEveety and Jan Michelini, an Italian and the movie's assistant director. On December 17, Wall Street Journal columnist Peggy Noonan reported John Paul II had said "It is as it was", citing McEveety, who said he heard it from Dziwisz. Noonan had emailed Joaquín Navarro-Valls, the head of the Vatican's press office, for confirmation before writing her column, surprised that the "famously close-mouthed" Navarro-Valls had approved the use of the "It is as it was" quote, and his emailed response stated he had no other comment at that time. National Catholic Reporter journalist John L. Allen Jr., published a similar account on the same day, quoting an unnamed senior Vatican official. Reuters and the Associated Press independently confirmed the story, citing Vatican sources.

A dispute emerged a few days later, when an anonymous Vatican official told Catholic News Service "There was no declaration, no judgment from the pope." But Allen defended his earlier reporting, saying that his official source was adamant about the veracity of the original story. Columnist Frank Rich for The New York Times wrote that the statement was "being exploited by the Gibson camp", and that when he asked Michelini about the meeting, Michelini said Dziwisz had reported the pope's words as "It is as it was", and said the pope also called the film "incredibile",  an Italian word Michelini translated as "amazing". The following day, Archbishop Dziwisz told CNS, "The Holy Father told no one his opinion of this film." This denial resulted in a round of commentators who accused the film producers of fabricating a papal quote to market their movie.

According to Rod Dreher in the Dallas Morning News, McEveety was sent an email from papal spokesman Navarro-Valls that supported the Noonan account, and suggested "It is as it was" could be used as the leitmotif in discussions on the film and said to "Repeat the words again and again and again." Dreher emailed Navarro-Valls a copy of the email McEveety had received, and Navarro-Valls emailed Dreher back and said, "I can categorically deny its authenticity." Dreher opined that either Mel Gibson's camp had created "a lollapalooza of a lie", or the Vatican was making reputable journalists and filmmakers look like "sleazebags or dupes" and he explained: 

Noonan noted that she and Dreher had discovered the emails were sent by "an email server in the Vatican's domain" from a Vatican computer with the same IP address. The Los Angeles Times reported that, when it asked after the story first broke if the "It is as it was" quote was reliable, Navarro-Valls had responded "I think you can consider that quote as accurate." Allen noted that while Dziwisz stated that Pope John Paul II made no declaration about this movie, other Vatican officials were "continuing to insist" the pope did say it, and other sources claimed they had heard Dziwisz say the pope said it on other occasions, and Allen called the situation "kind of a mess". A representative from Gibson's Icon Productions expressed surprise at Dziwisz's statements after the correspondence and conversations between film representatives and the pope's official spokesperson, Navarro-Valls, and stated "there is no reason to believe that the pope's support of the film 'isn't as it was.'"

After speaking to Dziwisz, Navarro-Valls confirmed John Paul II had seen The Passion of the Christ, and released the following official statement:
The film is a cinematographic transposition of the historical event of the Passion of Jesus Christ according to the accounts of the Gospel. It is a common practice of the Holy Father not to express public opinions on artistic works, opinions that are always open to different evaluations of aesthetic character.

In a follow-up column in The Wall Street Journal, Noonan addressed the question of why the issues being raised were not just "a tempest in a teapot" and she explained:

Allegations of antisemitism
Before the film was released, there were prominent criticisms of perceived antisemitic content in the film. It was for that reason that 20th Century Fox decided to pass on the film, informing New York Assemblyman Dov Hikind that a protest outside the News Corporation building made them decide against distributing the film. Hikind warned other companies that "they should not distribute this film. This is unhealthy for Jews all over the world."

A joint committee of the Secretariat for Ecumenical and Inter-religious Affairs of the United States Conference of Catholic Bishops and the Department of Inter-religious Affairs of the Anti-Defamation League obtained a version of the script before it was released in theaters. They released a statement, calling it one of the most troublesome texts, relative to anti-Semitic potential, that any of us had seen in 25 years. It must be emphasized that the main storyline presented Jesus as having been relentlessly pursued by an evil cabal of Jews, headed by the high priest Caiaphas, who finally blackmailed a weak-kneed Pilate into putting Jesus to death. This is precisely the storyline that fueled centuries of anti-Semitism within Christian societies. This is also a storyline rejected by the Roman Catholic Church at Vatican II in its document Nostra aetate, and by nearly all mainline Protestant churches in parallel documents...Unless this basic storyline has been altered by Mr. Gibson, a fringe Catholic who is building his own church in the Los Angeles area and who apparently accepts neither the teachings of Vatican II nor modern biblical scholarship, The Passion of the Christ retains a real potential for undermining the repudiation of classical Christian anti-Semitism by the churches in the last 40 years.

The ADL itself also released a statement about the yet-to-be-released film:
For filmmakers to do justice to the biblical accounts of the passion, they must complement their artistic vision with sound scholarship, which includes knowledge of how the passion accounts have been used historically to disparage and attack Jews and Judaism. Absent such scholarly and theological understanding, productions such as The Passion could likely falsify history and fuel the animus of those who hate Jews. Rabbi Daniel Lapin, the head of the Toward Tradition organization, criticized this statement, and said of Abraham Foxman, the head of the ADL, "what he is saying is that the only way to escape the wrath of Foxman is to repudiate your faith".

In The Nation, reviewer Katha Pollitt wrote: "Gibson has violated just about every precept of the United States Conference of Catholic Bishops own 1988 'Criteria' for the portrayal of Jews in dramatizations of the Passion (no bloodthirsty Jews, no rabble, no use of Scripture that reinforces negative stereotypes of Jews.) [...] The priests have big noses and gnarly faces, lumpish bodies, yellow teeth; Herod Antipas and his court are a bizarre collection of oily-haired, epicene perverts. The 'good Jews' look like Italian movie stars (Magdalene actually is an Italian movie star, Monica Bellucci); Jesus's mother, who would have been around 50 and appeared 70, could pass for a ripe 35." Jesuit priest Fr. William Fulco, S.J. of Loyola Marymount University—and the film's translator for Hebrew dialogue—specifically disagreed with that assessment, and disagreed with concerns that the film accused the Jewish community of deicide.

In The Guardian, Jewish biblical scholar and expert on the historical Jesus Géza Vermes wrote a highly critical review of the movie: he stated that the movie is "horribly gory, historically wrong - and it will inspire judeophobia". According to Vermes, "the real problem is not with his attitudes or avowed intentions, but with the lack of appropriate steps taken to prevent visual images from inspiring judeophobia. Caiaphas and his priestly colleagues often struggle not to smile when they see the defeat of Christ. In the film they allow their policemen to beat him up in open court without protest. In the Gospels itself they are depicted as doing things according to the book and reject the witnesses who testify against Jesus. This does not seem to be so in the film. These are dangerous opportunities for inspiring vengeful sentiments".

One specific scene in the film perceived as an example of anti-Semitism was in the dialogue of Caiaphas, when he states "His blood [is] on us and on our children!" (Mt 27:25), a quote historically interpreted by some as a curse taken upon by the Jewish people. Certain Jewish groups asked this be removed from the film. However, only the subtitles were removed; the original dialogue remains in the Hebrew soundtrack. When asked about this scene, Gibson said: "I wanted it in. My brother said I was wimping out if I didn't include it. But, man, if I included that in there, they'd be coming after me at my house. They'd come to kill me." In another interview when asked about the scene, he said, "It's one little passage, and I believe it, but I don't and never have believed it refers to Jews, and implicates them in any sort of curse. It's directed at all of us, all men who were there, and all that came after. His blood is on us, and that's what Jesus wanted. But I finally had to admit that one of the reasons I felt strongly about keeping it, aside from the fact it's true, is that I didn't want to let someone else dictate what could or couldn't be said."

The film's suggestion that the Temple's destruction was a direct result of the Sanhedrin's actions towards Jesus could also be interpreted as an offensive take on an event which Jewish tradition views as a tragedy, and which is still mourned by many Jews today on the fast day of Tisha B'Av.

Allegations of the film's antisemitism were intensified after Mel Gibson's 2006 arrest for driving under the influence in Malibu, California, where during the arrest, he made antisemitic remarks against the arresting officer. He was recorded saying to the officer, "Fucking Jews... the Jews are responsible for all the wars in the world. Are you a Jew?"

Reactions to allegations of antisemitism

Film critic Roger Ebert, who awarded The Passion of the Christ four out of four stars in his review for the Chicago Sun-Times, denied allegations that the film was anti-semitic. Ebert described the film as "a powerful and important film, helmed by a man with a sincere heart and a warrior's sense of justice. It is a story filled with searing images and ultimately a message of redemption and hope." Ebert said, "It also might just be the greatest cinematic version of the greatest story ever told."

Conservative columnist Cal Thomas also disagreed with allegations of antisemitism and wrote in Townhall: "To those in the Jewish community who worry that the film might contain anti-Semitic elements, or encourage people to persecute Jews, fear not. The film does not indict Jews for the death of Jesus." Two Orthodox Jews, Rabbi Daniel Lapin and conservative talk-show host and author Michael Medved, also vocally rejected claims that the film is antisemitic. They said the film contains many sympathetic portrayals of Jews: Simon of Cyrene (who helps Jesus carry the cross), Mary Magdalene, the Virgin Mary, St. Peter, St. John, Veronica (who wipes Jesus' face and offers him water), and several Jewish priests who protest Jesus' arrest (Nicodemus and Joseph of Arimathea) during Caiaphas' trial of Jesus.

Bob Smithouser of Focus on the Family's Plugged In also believed that the film was trying to convey the evils and sins of humanity rather than specifically targeting Jews, stating: "The anthropomorphic portrayal of Satan as a player in these events brilliantly pulls the proceedings into the supernatural realm—a fact that should have quelled the much-publicized cries of anti-Semitism since it shows a diabolical force at work beyond any political and religious agendas of the Jews and Romans."

Moreover, senior officer at the Vatican Cardinal Darío Castrillón Hoyos, who had seen the film, addressed the matter so:
Anti-Semitism, like all forms of racism, distorts the truth in order to put a whole race of people in a bad light. This film does nothing of the sort. It draws out from the historical objectivity of the Gospel narratives sentiments of forgiveness, mercy, and reconciliation. It captures the subtleties and the horror of sin, as well as the gentle power of love and forgiveness, without making or insinuating blanket condemnations against one group. This film expressed the exact opposite, that learning from the example of Christ, there should never be any more violence against any other human being.

Asked by Bill O'Reilly if his movie would "upset Jews", Gibson responded, "It's not meant to. I think it's meant to just tell the truth. I want to be as truthful as possible." In an interview for The Globe and Mail, he added: "If anyone has distorted Gospel passages to rationalize cruelty towards Jews or anyone, it's in defiance of repeated Papal condemnation. The Papacy has condemned racism in any form...Jesus died for the sins of all times, and I'll be the first on the line for culpability."

South Park parodied the controversy in the episodes "Good Times with Weapons", "Up the Down Steroid" and "The Passion of the Jew", all of which aired just a few weeks after the film's release.

Criticism of excessive violence
A.O. Scott in The New York Times wrote "The Passion of the Christ is so relentlessly focused on the savagery of Jesus' final hours that this film seems to arise less from love than from wrath, and to succeed more in assaulting the spirit than in uplifting it." David Edelstein, Slates film critic, dubbed the film "a two-hour-and-six-minute snuff movie—The Jesus Chainsaw Massacre—that thinks it's an act of faith", and further criticized Gibson for focusing on the brutality of Jesus' execution, instead of his religious teachings.

In 2008, writer Michael Gurnow in American Atheists stated much the same, labeling the work a mainstream snuff film. Critic Armond White, in his review of the film for Africana.com offered another perspective on the violence in the film. He wrote, "Surely Gibson knows (better than anyone in Hollywood is willing to admit) that violence sells. It's problematic that this time, Gibson has made a film that asks for a sensitive, serious, personal response to violence rather than his usual glorifying of vengeance."

During Diane Sawyer's interview of him, Gibson said:
I wanted it to be shocking; and I wanted it to be extreme...So that they see the enormity of that sacrifice; to see that someone could endure that and still come back with love and forgiveness, even through extreme pain and suffering and ridicule. The actual crucifixion was more violent than what was shown on the film, but I thought no one would get anything out of it.

Sequel
In June 2016, writer Randall Wallace stated that he and Gibson had begun work on a sequel to The Passion of the Christ which will focus on the resurrection of Jesus, and the events surrounding the resurrection. Wallace previously worked with Gibson as the screenwriter for Braveheart and director of We Were Soldiers. In September of that year, Gibson expressed his interest in directing it. He estimated that release of the film was still "probably three years off", stating that "it is a big project". He implied that part of the movie would be taking place in Hell and, while talking to Raymond Arroyo, said that it also may show flashbacks depicting the fall of the Angels.

In January 2018, Caviezel was in negotiations with Mel Gibson to reprise his role as Jesus in the sequel. In March 2020, Caviezel stated in an interview that the film was in its fifth draft. Later that year, Caviezel said that Gibson had sent him the third draft of the screenplay. Caviezel said that it would be titled The Passion of the Christ: Resurrection and predicted, "It's going to be the biggest film in world history."

In January 2023, a report stated that the film would begin production in mid-2023, with Jim Caviezel set to return in the role of Jesus, also stating that it would be a non-linear, introspective film, and that "other realms" and "dimensions" would be explored. Gibson has also stated in separate interviews that the fall of the Angels and the Harrowing of Hell would also be key parts of the film. Caviezel stated that "the film will shock audiences" and "it will be the biggest film the world has ever seen."

See also

Depiction of Jesus

References

External links

 
2004 films
2004 drama films
2004 independent films
2004 multilingual films
2000s American films
2000s Hebrew-language films
American drama films
American epic films
American independent films
American multilingual films
Aramaic-language films
Caiaphas
Censored films
Christianity in popular culture controversies
Cultural depictions of Judas Iscariot
Cultural depictions of Pontius Pilate
Cultural depictions of Saint Peter
Demons in film
The Devil in film
Film portrayals of Jesus' death and resurrection
Films about capital punishment
Films about Christianity
Films directed by Mel Gibson
Films produced by Bruce Davey
Films produced by Mel Gibson
Films set in the Roman Empire
Films scored by John Debney
Films shot in Matera
Films shot in Rome
Films with screenplays by Mel Gibson
Golden Eagle Award (Russia) for Best Foreign Language Film winners
Icon Productions films
Judaism-related controversies
Latin-language films
Newmarket films
Portrayals of Jesus in film
Portrayals of Mary Magdalene in film
Portrayals of the Virgin Mary in film
Obscenity controversies in film
Religious controversies in film
Religious controversies in the United States
Religious epic films
Scanbox Entertainment films
Torture in films